Euplassa isernii is a species of plant in the family Proteaceae. It is endemic to Peru.

References

isernii
Endemic flora of Peru
Vulnerable flora of South America
Taxonomy articles created by Polbot